Wilton Manors is a city in Broward County, Florida, United States. As of the 2020 census, the city had a population of 11,426. Wilton Manors is part of the Miami metropolitan area, which was home to 6,166,488 people at the 2020 census.

History 
In the early 20th century, the area now known as Wilton Manors was known as Colohatchee. A train stop along the Florida East Coast Railroad near the current NE 24th Street shared that name. The name Wilton Manors was coined in 1925 by Ned Willingham, a Georgia transplant and land developer. Wilton Manors was incorporated in 1947.

The city is home to a sizable LGBT population and has become a destination for LGBT tourists, who frequent its many nightclubs and gay-owned businesses along the main street, Wilton Drive; the 2010 U.S. Census reported that it is second only to Provincetown, Massachusetts in the proportion (15%) of gay couples relative to the total population (couples as reported to the U.S. Census). It contains a large Pride Center, the World AIDS Museum and Educational Center, and a branch of the Stonewall National Museum & Archives, whose main facility is in neighboring Fort Lauderdale. A city web page highlights LGBT+ life in Wilton Manors. As of the November 2018 elections, Wilton Manors became the first city in Florida and only the second city in the United States to have an all-LGBT+ governing body.

Since the late 1990s, the Wilton Drive main street corridor has undergone an economic transformation. Formerly a sleepy street lined with small retail shops, Wilton Drive is now the city's arts and entertainment district, home to numerous restaurants, bars, shops, condos and rental developments that have blossomed over the last decade. Many of the businesses in the arts and entertainment district are LGBT-owned and/or operated, and "The Drive" has become a local, regional, and national destination for LGBT+ tourism. In late 2018, construction began on a "Complete Streets" project that will see wider sidewalks, on-street parking, buffered bike lines, and the reduction of vehicular lanes from four to two. Construction of the roadway portion of the project is projected to be completed in late 2019, followed by the landscaping portion of the project.

Another example of the economic revitalization in Wilton Manors is the Highland Estates neighborhood, bordered by NE 26th Street on the south, Dixie Highway on the east, the North Fork of the Middle River on the north, and NE 6th Avenue on the west, was significantly transformed in the decade from 1995 to 2005 from a blighted area to an upscale neighborhood with multiple new modern townhouse developments. Citywide real estate prices increased with, and even ahead of, the national trend in the years of the expansion of the housing bubble (2000–2007). In 2007, the city's taxable property values had grown to $1.26 billion, according to the Broward County Property Appraiser's office. Again following the national trend as the housing bubble burst, Wilton Manors real property taxable values fell 36% from 2007 through 2011. An upward trend in values resumed in 2012 and has continued through the present, with Wilton Manors consistently ranking in the top tier of cities in Broward County with the highest increases in taxable property values. According to the Broward County Property Appraiser, the city's 2019 taxable values are approximately $1.48 billion and total assessed market values are just over $2.22 billion.

Wilton Manors is home to several recreational facilities, the largest of which are Hagen Park, Richardson Historic Park and Nature Preserve, and Island City Park Preserve. Other Wilton Manors parks include Donn Eisele Park, Snook Creek Park and Boat Ramp, and Colohatchee Park, a  recreational facility complete with a boardwalk for nature observation, a dog park, and a boat ramp for watercraft entry. In addition, there are several pocket parks throughout the city. Another major city park is Mickel Field, which was traditionally a busy hub for local baseball and softball leagues. At the request of the surrounding neighborhood residents, Mickel Field underwent a significant renovation and re-opened in Summer 2015 with new walking trails, fitness station, picnic and performance pavilion, and other new facilities more in tune with the needs of current residents. In 2019, a significant renovation was completed at Colohatchee Park.

On June 19, 2021, at the start of the Stonewall Pride Parade in Wilton Manors, a member of the Fort Lauderdale Gay Men's Chorus lost control of the truck he was driving, which was to be a part of the parade, and drove into other members of his group, killing 75-year-old James Fahy and injuring 2 others, one of whom was put into critical condition, before going on to strike a nearby garden store. The driver, identified as 77-year-old Fred Johnson Jr., narrowly missed U.S. Representative Debbie Wasserman Schultz, who was seated in a convertible at the time of the accident. The accident caused the parade to be canceled.

Geography

Wilton Manors is bordered on the north by the North Fork of the Middle River and the city of Oakland Park; to the south, the boundaries include the South Fork of the Middle River and the city of Fort Lauderdale; the eastern terminus of the city limits extends to near Federal Highway (US 1); and the westernmost boundary reaches Interstate 95. Wilton Manors completely surrounds the separately incorporated village of Lazy Lake. Since it is surrounded by water, Wilton Manors has gained the nickname "Island City."

Demographics

2020 census

As of the 2020 United States census, there were 11,426 people, 6,577 households, and 2,042 families residing in the city.

2010 census

As of 2010 there were 7,162 households, of which 12.9% were vacant. In 2000, 18.1% had children under the age of 18 living with them, 28.4% were married couples living together, 9.0% had a female householder with no husband present, and 58.0% were non-families. 40.7% of all households were made up of individuals, and 9.7% had someone living alone who was 65 years of age or older.  The average household size was 2.06 and the average family size was 2.91.

2000 census
In 2000, the city the population was spread out, with 16.6% under the age of 18, 6.3% from 18 to 24, 36.4% from 25 to 44, 25.0% from 45 to 64, and 15.7% who were 65 years of age or older.  The median age was 40 years. For every 100 females, there were 123.7 males.  For every 100 females age 18 and over, there were 128.2 males.

In 2000, the median income for a household in the city was $38,366, and the median income for a family was $43,346. Males had a median income of $31,857 versus $26,522 for females. The per capita income for the city was $21,770.  About 10.7% of families and 15.4% of the population were below the poverty line, including 25.3% of those under age 18 and 13.4% of those age 65 or over.

Wilton Manors is known as a gay village. Wilton Manors ranks 2nd in the U.S. for its percentage of gay couples as a proportion of total population, with 140 gay couples per 1,000 residents or 1,600 persons or 14% of the inhabitants. The Fort Lauderdale area ranks 4th in metro areas (per capita).  Neighboring Oakland Park is ranked sixth on the list. Wilton Manors has approximately 1270% more resident gay couples per capita than the national average of 1.1% of the population.

As of 2000, speakers of English as a first language accounted for 78.52% of the population, while Spanish was at 9.37%, French Creole at 7.13%, French at 2.31%, Italian at 1.22%, as well as Portuguese being at 0.68%, German being 0.55%, and Polish as a mother tongue of 0.17% of all residents.

As of 2000, Wilton Manors was the 133rd most Cuban-populated area in the US (tied with Hasbrouck Heights, New Jersey) at 1.58% of the population, while it had the twenty-seventh highest percentage of Haitians in the US, (tied with North Lauderdale and Florida City) at 6.7% of all residents.

Government

Since the early 2000s Wilton Manors has voted overwhelmingly Democratic, higher than the state and county average.  This is largely due to the city's large LGBT population and minority residents.  In 2018 the city became the second city in the United States (after Palm Springs, California) to have a gay mayor and all-LGBT city commission.

Wilton Manors is located in Florida's 22nd U.S. congressional district. Wilton Manors citizens are represented in Congress by Ted Deutch.

The city holds nonpartisan elections to elect city officials.

Media

Wilton Manors is part of the Miami-Fort Lauderdale-Hollywood media market, which is the twelfth largest radio market and the seventeenth largest television market in the United States. Its primary daily newspapers are the South Florida Sun-Sentinel and The Miami Herald, and their Spanish-language counterparts El Sentinel and El Nuevo Herald. A number of LGBT+ publications also serve the community; including South Florida Gay News, The Mirror, OutClique, and Hot Spots.

In 2010 Wilton Manors Main Street (now Wilton Manors Development alliance) aided Brazos Films in the production of episode seven of their award-winning series One Square Mile.

Education

Primary and secondary schools
Broward County Public Schools operates public schools. Most portions are zoned to Wilton Manors Elementary, while some are zoned to Bennett Elementary School. All residential areas are zoned to Sunrise Middle School, and Fort Lauderdale High School.

In addition the community is in the service area of the magnet school Pompano Beach High School.

There is also an area charter school in Wilton Manors, Somerset Academy Village.

The Roman Catholic Archdiocese of Miami previously operated the Saint Clement School in Wilton Manors. It opened in the 1950s and closed in 2009. According to Akilah Johnson of the South Florida Sun Sentinel, area parents indicated that St. Ambrose School in Deerfield Beach and St. Jerome's Catholic School in Fort Lauderdale would take most of the students who could not go to Saint Clement anymore.

Libraries
Wilton Manors' first library opened on June 24, 1957, as a project of the Jayceettes and staffed by volunteers. "The city took over the library in August 1958... and moved the library to the original city hall. In 1960, the building was enlarged to double its space." In 2003, construction was completed on a  library expansion. The library, now called the Richard C. Sullivan Public Library of Wilton Manors, is not a part of the Broward County Library system. It is one of only five municipal libraries in Broward County. The Richard C. Sullivan Public Library is a heavily used facility. The volunteer organization, Friends of the Wilton Manors Public Library, actively supports the library's collections and programming.

See also
 LGBT culture in Miami

References

External links

Wilton Manors Historical Society
Wilton Manors Boat Rental

Cities in Broward County, Florida
Gay villages in Florida
Cities in Florida